Yury Nikolaevich Grigorovsky (born March 28, 1939) is a Russian water polo player who competed for the Soviet Union in the 1960 Summer Olympics and in the 1968 Summer Olympics.

He was born in Moscow.

Career 
In 1960 he was a member of the Soviet team which won the silver medal in the Olympic water polo competition. He played six matches and scored two goals.

Eight years later he won his second silver medal with the Soviet team in the water polo tournament at the 1968 Games. He played all eight matches and scored eleven goals.

See also 
 List of Olympic medalists in water polo (men)

External links
 

1939 births
Living people
Russian male water polo players
Soviet male water polo players
Olympic water polo players of the Soviet Union
Water polo players at the 1960 Summer Olympics
Water polo players at the 1968 Summer Olympics
Olympic silver medalists for the Soviet Union
Olympic medalists in water polo
Sportspeople from Moscow
Medalists at the 1968 Summer Olympics
Medalists at the 1960 Summer Olympics